The liberal democratic basic order ( (FDGO)) is a fundamental term in German constitutional law. It determines the unalienable, invariable core structure of the German commonwealth. As such, it is the core substance of the German constitution. Building upon more general definitions of liberal democracy, the term has a specific legal meaning in Germany and is part of the German (originally West German) system of a Streitbare Demokratie ("fortified democracy") that bans attempts to dismantle the liberal democratic basic order by what German authorities refer to as "enemies of the Constitution" or "extremists". In practice the concept has been used to target far-left and far-right groups and in the ideological struggle against East German communism during the Cold War; during the Cold War the concept was closely linked to the state doctrine of anti-communism in West Germany. Theoretically the concept is associated with anti-totalitarianism and with the scholarly field of democracy and extremism research in Germany. While often relying upon scholars in this field, the decision that a group threatens the liberal democratic basic order is ultimately a political decision that is the responsibility of the interior minister at the state or federal level, or, in the case of a ban, a legal decision that is decided by the judiciary.

History and definition

The FDGO touches on the political order and the societal and political values on which German liberal democracy rests. According to the German constitutional court, the free democratic order is defined thus:

The free democratic basic order can be defined as an order which excludes any form of tyranny or arbitrariness and represents a governmental system under a rule of law, based upon self-determination of the people as expressed by the will of the existing majority and upon freedom and equality. The fundamental principles of this order include at least: respect for the human rights given concrete form in the Basic Law, in particular for the right of a person to life and free development; popular sovereignty; separation of powers; responsibility of government; lawfulness of administration; independence of the judiciary; the multi-party principle; and equality of opportunities for all political parties.

People and groups that threaten the liberal democratic basic order are referred to as "enemies of the Constitution" or "extremist" in German government and legal language. Parties as well as groups can be banned if they strive to abolish the FDGO, which has been done so successfully in regard to the Communist Party (1956) and the Socialist Reich Party (1952). In 2003 as well as in 2017, attempts to ban the National Democratic Party (NPD) failed. The willingness of a liberal democracy to ban parties that endanger liberal democracy itself has been termed "militant democracy", or "wehrhafte Demokratie" in German. While conceptually largely similar to broader definitions of liberal democracy, the liberal democratic basic order is distinguished by the measures that are allowed against "extreme" ideologies and groups to defend the order, such as the possibility to ban or officially monitor extremist groups.

The liberal democratic basic order has been a core concept in the constitutional law of the Federal Republic of Germany, originally West Germany, since 1949, and it played a significant role in the West German government's efforts to counteract communism during the Cold War. The concept is closely linked to the state doctrine of anti-communism in the Federal Republic of Germany (West Germany) during the Cold War. Examples include the ban of the Communist Party in 1956 and 1972 Anti-Radical Decree aimed at left-wing "radicals." The German Restitution Laws also contained a "communist exception" that specifically determined that "enemies of the liberal democratic basic order", in practice communists, were not entitled to compensation for earlier Nazi persecution. Communist groups have been extensively monitored by the Federal Office for the Protection of the Constitution and the state offices for the protection of the constitution under the umbrella term of "far-left extremism"; during the Cold War the Federal Agency for Civic Education also focused in large part on Communists as enemies of the liberal democratic basic order, and the struggle against communism was framed by West German authorities primarily in terms of civic education and anti-extremism.

The concept of the liberal democratic basic order has been and is being rejected by parts of the left spectrum, the Antifa as well as people on the extreme right.

Literature 
 Donald P. Kommers (1980): The Jurisprudence of Free Speech in the United States and the Federal Republic of Germany. In: Scholarly Works. Notre Dame Law School.

See also 

 Basic structure doctrine

References 

German constitutional law
Democracy
Political systems
Anti-communism in Germany
Anti-fascism in Germany